The Type 87 Reconnaissance Combat Vehicle, also simply known as "RCV" and nicknamed Black Eye (ブラックアイ), is a 6x6 wheeled reconnaissance vehicle designed and manufactured by Komatsu Limited and employed exclusively by the Japan Ground Self-Defense Force. The JGSDF continued to commission new units up until as recently as 2013.

History
After World War II, the United States provided the newly-created Japan Ground Self-Defense Force with a number of variants of the M8 Greyhound armoured car. However, a relatively small number of these were employed due to concerns about the poor quality of roads in Japan, as many Japanese roads were unpaved and poorly maintained, limiting the feasibility of wheeled vehicles for military service. By 1982, Japanese infrastructure had greatly improved, motivating the development of the first armoured fighting vehicle developed and manufactured by Japanese industry for the Japanese armed forces, the successful Type 82 'Shikitsu' Command Vehicle. Tests for the Type 87 began in 1985 and the Type 87 would later finish developed by Komatsu based on the earlier Type 82.

Features
The Type 87 accommodates five crew members, two of which occupy the powered-traverse turret located in the center of the hull. The vehicle's door is on the left of the main body. The hull is made out of steel and is fully welded, and utilizes many of the same automotive components of the Type 82 and features power steering. The main armament is a Japanese version of the Oerlikon Contraves 25 millimeter autocannon produced under licence, which can fire various kinds of ammunition at up to 600 rounds per minute. Its armor, while sturdy enough to protect the vehicle and crew against small arms fire and grenade shrapnel, will not protect against heavier ordnance.

Gallery

References

External links

www.army-technology.com
www.tanks-encyclopedia.com
perfiles.elgrancapitan.org
www.deagel.com

Armoured cars of Japan
Japan Ground Self-Defense Force
Wheeled amphibious armoured fighting vehicles
Wheeled reconnaissance vehicles
Reconnaissance vehicles of Japan
Six-wheeled vehicles
Military vehicles introduced in the 1980s